Shotgun Man was an assassin and spree killer in Chicago, Illinois in the 1910s, to whom murders by Black Hand extortionists were attributed. Most notably, Shotgun Man killed 15 Italian immigrants from January 1, 1910 to March 26, 1911 at "Death Corner," a notoriously violent Italian immigrant neighborhood at the intersection of Oak Street and Milton Avenue (now Cleveland Avenue) in what was then Chicago's Little Sicily. The area was notorious for violence committed by Italian immigrants and Italian-Americans, both independently and as a result of Italian gangs, the Mafia, and Black Hand feuding and vendettas. In March 1911, the so-called Shotgun Man reportedly murdered four people within 72 hours.

Background
Although the killings were witnessed by dozens of bystanders, the Chicago police were never able to identify the murderer. However, he was said to be well known throughout the Italian community and, with the political influence of the Black Hand, residents may have been hesitant to turn in the assassin. Although the fate of Shotgun Man is unknown, he seems to have disappeared from Little Italy shortly before Prohibition, as extortion operations of the Black Hand had faded away by the end of the decade.

See also
Aldermen's wars
Axeman of New Orleans
Chicago Outfit
List of fugitives from justice who disappeared

References

1910 in Illinois
1910 murders in the United States
1911 in Illinois
1911 murders in the United States
American Mafia
American spree killers
Crimes in Chicago
Mafia hitmen
Mass murder in 1910
Mass murder in 1911
Murder in Illinois
People from Chicago
Unidentified American criminals
Unsolved murders in the United States
Unidentified American serial killers